Honda Atlas Cars Pakistan is a Pakistani automobile manufacturer which is a  subsidiary of Japanese car maker Honda. Founded in 1992, as a joint venture between Honda Motor and Atlas Group, based in Lahore, Pakistan.

The company stock is traded on the Pakistan Stock Exchange.

Honda Atlas is the authorized assembler and manufacturer of Honda vehicles in Pakistan.

History
Honda Atlas was incorporated on 4 November 1992, while the joint venture agreement was signed on 5 August 1993. The manufacturing plant was inaugurated 17 April 1993 and the first car rolled off the assembly line on 26 May 1994. By July 1994, six dealerships were established in Karachi, Lahore, and Islamabad.

Major operations

2023 
Honda Atlas Cars Pakistan increased the prices of its vehicles in February 2023 due to the hike in sales tax and the devaluation of the Pakistani Rupee against the US Dollar. The Finance Supplementary Bill 2023 was approved by the federal cabinet, allowing an increase in general sales tax to 18% and additional taxes on luxury items. The uncertain economic situation and devaluation of local currency made it difficult for Honda Pakistan to hold the current retail selling prices, so the company passed on the impact to the market. This decision led to a decline in sales, as the company only sold 1,636 cars last month, witnessing a 39% MoM decline in sales. The unavailability of assembly kits and intermittent production shutdowns may also have contributed to the decline.

Products

Sedans
 Honda City
 Honda Civic
 Honda Accord

SUVs & MPVs
 Honda BR-V
 Honda CR-V
 Honda HR-V

Former Vehicles
 Honda CR-Z

See also 
 Automotive industry in Pakistan
 Atlas Group
 Honda

References

External links 
 Honda Pakistan
 Honda Global site

Honda
Car manufacturers of Pakistan
Manufacturing companies based in Lahore
Vehicle manufacturing companies established in 1992
Pakistani companies established in 1992
Pakistani subsidiaries of foreign companies
Companies listed on the Pakistan Stock Exchange